The Deberry-Hurt House is a historic house in Madison County, Tennessee, U.S.. It was built for Mathias Deberry in 1823. It was expanded by his son-in-law, Robert B. Hurt, in 1855. By 1922, it belonged to Hurt's granddaughter, Elizabeth Hurt Leeper.

The house was designed in the Federal architectural style. It has been listed on the National Register of Historic Places since July 8, 1980.

References

National Register of Historic Places in Madison County, Tennessee
Federal architecture in Tennessee
Houses completed in 1823